The Itombe Formation is a geological formation of the  Kwanza Basin in Angola dated to the Coniacian stage of the Late Cretaceous. The environment of deposition is shallow marine. Reptile fossils have been recovered from the Tadi beds locality within the formation, including the dinosaur Angolatitan, the mosasaurs Angolasaurus and Mosasaurus iembeensis and the turtle Angolachelys.The Itombe formation was formerly considered Turonian in age, but new data suggests to be Coniacian.

See also 
 List of fossiliferous stratigraphic units in Angola
 Geology of Angola
 Santos Formation

References

Further reading 
 M. T. Antunes. 1964. O Neocretacio e o Cenozoico do litoral de Angola. Junta de Investigcoes do Ultramar 1-254

Geologic formations of Angola
Upper Cretaceous Series of Africa
Shale formations
Shallow marine deposits
Fossiliferous stratigraphic units of Africa
Paleontology in Angola
Bengo Province
Coniacian Stage